Wunderbar is an album by Italian baritone Patrizio Buanne, which was released on January 27, 2012. It is his first album, which is mainly sung in German.

Most songs on this album are cover versions, whereas Du warst das Boot auf dem Meer der Farben and Wunderbar were especially written for this album. A bonus edition of this album was released on October 12, 2012 containing two additional Christmas songs: a German/Italian version of Jingle Bells and Stille Nacht.

Track listing

Charts

References

2012 albums
Patrizio Buanne albums